Epinotia immundana is a moth of the family Tortricidae. It is found in China (Qinghai), Russia and Europe.

The wingspan is 12–14 mm. As in many other species of the genus Epinotia, it is fairly variable in colour. Often there is a large, triangular white spot at the dorsal edge of the forewings and a smaller light stain at the tornus. The hindwings are light grey-brown.

In the British Isles and adjoining areas of continental Europe, the moth flies from April to June and again, in the south, in August and September.

The larvae mainly feed on alder Alnus glutinosa, birch and rose.

References

External links
 
 waarneming.nl 
 Epinotia immundana at Norfolk Moths

Eucosmini
Moths described in 1839
Tortricidae of Europe
Taxa named by Josef Emanuel Fischer von Röslerstamm